Bissill is a surname. Notable people with the surname include:

 George Bissill (1896–1973), British miner, painter, and furniture designer
 Richard Bissill, British French horn player, composer, and arranger